Order of the Croatian Cross is the 15th important medal given by Republic of Croatia. The order was founded on April 1, 1995.

Overview 
The Order of the Croatian Cross is awarded to Croatian and foreign nationals who were severely wounded while participating in the Croatian War of Independence.

The medal is awarded by the President of Croatia or his deputy.

Recipients 
 Drago Lovrić
 Predrag Matić
 Mirko Šundov
 Bekim Berisha

References 

Orders, decorations, and medals of Croatia
Wound decorations
Awards established in 1995
1995 establishments in Croatia
Campaign medals